Afrique contemporaine is a quarterly peer-reviewed academic journal published by De Boeck Brussels, Belgium.

External links 
 

French-language journals
African studies journals
Quarterly journals
Publications established in 2003